Brahim Zaari (born 12 October 1989 in Schaijk) is a professional footballer who plays for Raja Casablanca. Born in the Netherlands, he elected to represent Morocco at international level.

Clubs career
Zaari made his professional debut during the 24th game of the 2007–08 Eerste Divisie with FC Den Bosch when he replaced John Vos who was injured in the 89th minute.

The next season Zaari gained his place with the team and became the first goalkeeper until the last games of 2010–11 when the coach preferred to start with Wesley de Ruiter. In June 2011, FC Eindhoven had announced that the signing of a free transfer contract with Zaari, who played with the club for two years.

On 31 August 2013 Zaari signed a 4-year contract with Moroccan champions Raja Casablanca.

International career
Zaari earned his first call-up for Morocco for a friendly against the Czech Republic on 11 February 2009 played in Casablanca; he remained an unused substitute, and the match finished 0–0.

References

1989 births
Living people
Dutch footballers
Dutch sportspeople of Moroccan descent
FC Den Bosch players
FC Eindhoven players
Eerste Divisie players
People from Landerd
Association football goalkeepers
Footballers from North Brabant
Raja CA players
Blauw Geel '38 players